are five road bridges in southern Japan, linking the Kyushu mainland (Kumamoto Prefecture) and the Amakusa Islands. The bridges connect the islands of Ōyano-jima, Nagaura-jima, Ike-jima, and Maeshima, and were completed on September 24, 1966. The Five Bridges gave hope and confidence in the development of Japan's bridge-construction technology, and changed the lives of those living at the Amakusa Islands (see survey below: Evaluation). Many tourists come to view the scenic beauty of the many islands, and the roads are called the Amakusa Pearl Line, based on the products of cultured pearls.

Significance
The completion of these bridges coincided with the popularization of automobiles in Japanese families, with the launch of the Nissan Sunny 1000cc series and the Toyota Corolla 1100cc series, foretelling the so-called "My Car" age. The Five Bridges started as toll roads and were expected to continue for 39 years, but the explosive motorization collected tolls much faster, and ended the payment after nine years (in 1975).

Bridges

In Japanese, a bridge is known as a hashi, but when the word "hashi" is used after words, the forms "bashi" or "kyō" may be used instead, depending on the situation, sometimes interchangeably.

Tenmon Bashi (or Tenmon Kyō)

Ōyano Bashi
It connects Ōyano-jima and Nagaura-jima. It is a  Langer Truss bridge of pale yellow color.

Nakano Hashi

Maeshima Bashi
This is a rigid-frame bridge of concrete color, connecting Ooike-jima and Maeshima.

Matsushima Bashi (Hashi)
This is a pipe-arch bridge, painted in red, connecting Maeshima and Matsushimachō, Aizu, Kami-Amakusa.

History
The following are major events in the history of the bridges:
1936: Kumamoto Prefecture Assemblyman Jishu Mori (1890–1973) stated the need for bridges connecting Amakusa Islands and mainland of Kyushu.
1954: Kumamoto Prefecture started the investigation of Amakusa bridges.
1956: Japan Traffic Corporation also began investigation of Amakusa bridges.
1956: Japan Traffic Corporation created a branch for the construction of bridges.
September 24, 1966: Service of the bridges started as a toll road.
August 10, 1975: The payment as a toll road was discontinued.

Evaluation of the Five Bridges
The road agency evaluated the construction of the Five bridges of Amakusa in 1976 (10 years later), by questionnaires. The results were:
Traffic networks greatly improved. 93.4%
Traffic accidents greatly increased. 93.2%
Trade greatly increased. 75.6%
Amakusa area greatly developed. 68.8%
Public hazards increased. 67.9%
Oneness of Kyushu and Amakusa. 65.4%
Shopping became convenient. 60.3%
Living conditions improved. 43.7%
Toll road fares too high. 41.6% (toll road discontinued on August 10, 1975)
Public morals deteriorated. 32.1%
Income of people increased. 22.1%
Oneness of Amakusa increased. 21.9%
Increase of jobs. 16.3%
Prices of commodities lowered. 10.2%

See also
History of Kumamoto Prefecture

References
"Construction Report, Amakusa Five Bridges" (1966), Dobokugakkai, in Japanese.
"History of Constructions in Amakusa" (1978), Amakusachiku Kensetsugyou Kyoukai, in Japanese.

Notes

External links
Amakusa Gokyō, with pictures, 2010.1.10 

Bridges in Japan
Buildings and structures in Kumamoto Prefecture
Tourist attractions in Kumamoto Prefecture
Roads in Kumamoto Prefecture
Former toll bridges in Japan